The cent is a customary unit of measurement still used in some parts of southern Indian states such as Andhra Pradesh, Telangana, Kerala, Tamil Nadu and Karnataka despite the usual use of metric units for other instances. It is still used in many news reports and real estate deals.

Detailed conversion chart

See also
List of customary units of measurement in South Asia
Ankanam

References

Customary units in India
Units of area